A Woman in Berlin, known as The Downfall of Berlin Anonyma in the UK, is a 2008 German film directed by Max Färberböck, starring Nina Hoss and Eugeny Sidikhin. It is based on the memoir, Eine Frau in Berlin, published anonymously (by Marta Hillers) in 1959 in German, with a new edition in 2003. (It was also published in English in 1954 and 2005, and in seven other languages.)

The film premiered at the 2009 Berlin Film Festival and was praised for its portrayal of a morally complex and brutal period.

Plot 
In the waning days of World War II, an assortment of women, children and elderly men struggle to survive in Berlin, cast out of their formerly middle-class lives.

The Soviet Red Army arrives, defeating the last German defense. Its soldiers rape women of any age as they occupy the city. After having been raped by a number of Soviet soldiers, the film's anonymous woman, a German journalist (Nina Hoss), petitions the battalion's commanding officer for an alliance and protection. After initially rejecting her, the married officer Andrei Rybkin (Eugeny Sidikhin) is gradually seduced by the beautiful but battered German woman. She has a cool, practical approach to her life and has been part of an informal community that developed among survivors in her apartment building.

The officer subsequently protects, feeds and parties with her and her neighbors. Other women in the flats also take particular officers or soldiers for protection against being raped by soldiers at large. Rybkin comes under suspicion and he is reassigned.

Cast 
 Nina Hoss - Anonyma
 Eugeny Sidikhin - Andrej Rybkin
 Irm Hermann - Witwe
 Rüdiger Vogler - Eckhart
 Ulrike Krumbiegel - Ilse Hoch
 Rolf Kanies - Friedrich Hoch
 Jördis Triebel - Bärbel Malthaus
 Roman Gribkov - Anatol
 Juliane Köhler - Elke
 Samvel Muzhikyan - Andropov
 August Diehl - Gerd
 Aleksandra Kulikova - Masha
 Viktor Zhalsanov - asiatischer Rotarmist
 Oleg Chernov - Erster Vergewaltiger
 Eva Löbau - Frau Wendt
 Anne Kanis - Flüchtlingsmädchen
 Sebastian Urzendowsky - Junger Soldat

Reception
The film received strong reviews for its brutal truthfulness. The Washington Post described it as "A clear-eyed portrait of a highly charged chapter in Germany's history, a history that once again proves rewarding fodder for an alert artistic imagination." The reviewer wrote that after the film portrays the initial rapes and assaults against German women by Soviet soldiers, it takes a "much more somber and morally complex turn." The protagonist and her mostly women neighbors must "navigate a city that's become a physical and psychic no-man's land."

Roger Ebert noted that "Yes, she profits from their liaison, and yes, he eventually takes up her offer. But for each there is the illusion that this is something they choose to do....The woman and man [Andrei] make the best accommodation they can with the reality that confronts them."

The Austin Chronicle praised Hoss "in a supremely complex and modulated performance." It described the film as "that rarest of wartime dramas: an intimate, sorrowful glimpse into the heart and loins of the hellish aftermath of war."

See also
 List of German films

References

External links
 A Woman in Berlin at Strand Releasing
 
 
 A Woman in Berlin at Metacritic
 
 

German war drama films
Polish war drama films
2000s German-language films
Films based on non-fiction books
German World War II films
Films about the Battle of Berlin
Films scored by Zbigniew Preisner
Films set in Berlin
2008 films
Films shot in Cologne
2000s German films
Women in Berlin